John I. Gallin (born March 25, 1943) is an American medical researcher who has contributed to the understanding of innate immunity but especially chronic granulomatous disease, a phagocyte disorder. Gallin was appointed director of the NIH Clinical Center on May 1, 1994, and served until January 8, 2017. He serves as the chief scientific officer for the Clinical Center and associate director for clinical research at the National Institutes of Health.

Education and career
Gallin was born on March 25, 1943, in New York City, His father was an attorney, and his mother was trained as a social worker, but then became a stay-at-home mom. He graduated from New Rochelle High School in New Rochelle, NY, in 1961. He graduated cum laude from Amherst College in 1965.  He earned his M.D.  from  Cornell Medical College of Cornell University in 1969.

After a medical internship and residency at New York University’s Bellevue Hospital, in 1971 he began postdoctoral training in basic and clinical research in infectious diseases at the National Institutes of Health as a clinical associate in the Laboratory of Clinical Investigation, National Institute of Allergy and Infectious Diseases. Gallin returned to New York University's Bellevue Hospital as senior chief medical resident from 1974 to 1975, then came back to NIH.

In 1985, he was appointed scientific director for intramural research activities at the NIAID, a position he held for the next nine years. Gallin was the founding chief of NIAID's Laboratory of Host Defenses in 1991 and served as chief of the laboratory for 12 years. He continues as chief of the lab's clinical pathophysiology section in a new version of the lab called the Laboratory of Clinical Immunology and Microbiology.

Gallin was the 10th director of the NIH Clinical Center, a position he held for 22 years, the longest serving director. The Clinical Center is the largest hospital focused solely on clinical research and serves the scientific and medical needs of 17 NIH institutes.  In 2011, under Gallin's leadership, the Clinical Center was the only hospital to receive the Lasker-Bloomberg Public Service Award.

In August 2016, Gallin was appointed to the newly created positions of NIH associate director for clinical research and chief scientific officer for the Clinical Center. These posts report directly to the NIH Director and oversee independent research programs, clinical research training and the scientific review process for all clinical protocols conducted at the NIH. On January 8, 2017, Gallin stepped down as the director of the NIH Clinical Center to focus full-time as the chief scientific officer of the Clinical Center and NIH associate director for clinical research.

Gallin served as Assistant Surgeon General of the United States Public Health Service and retired from the USPHS as a rear admiral.

Gallin has published or co-authored more than 355 articles in scientific journals and has edited two textbooks: Inflammation, Basic Principles and Clinical Correlates (Lippincott, Williams, and Wilkins, 1999) and Principles and Practices of Clinical Research (Academic Press, 2002, 4th edition (2018).

Medical research
Gallin's primary research interests are on the role of phagocytes, the body's scavenger cells in host defense. His research has focused on rare hereditary immune disorders, and he identified the genetic basis of several diseases of the phagocytes (neutrophils and macrophages).

The laboratory has focused on neutrophil-specific granule deficiency, actin interacting protein deficiency and chronic granulomatous disease (CGD).  When phagocytes fail to produce hydrogen peroxide and bleach, CGD results. The laboratory described the genetic basis for several forms of CGD and the research has reduced life-threatening bacterial and fungal infections in CGD patients. The laboratory discovered that when CGD patients get older they are protected from atherosclerosis (narrowing of the arteries), suggesting the abnormal enzyme in this disease might be a drugable target for normal people with disorders of inflammation such as atherosclerosis.

Achievements as NIH Clinical Center Director

During his tenure as director of the NIH Clinical Center, Gallin oversaw the design and construction of the Mark O. Hatfield Clinical Research Center (CRC), an 870,000-square-foot research hospital added to the original structure. The CRC opened to patients in 2005.

Gallin also established a new curriculum for clinical research training that is now offered globally reaching over 20,000 students annually throughout the United States and in over 150 countries, and he supported development of new information systems for sharing biomedical translational and clinical research.

Gallin was key to establishing a Patient Advisory Group at the Clinical Center in 1998, one of the first for patients participating in clinical research. He, along with Clinical Center nurses, conceived and championed identifying resources from the NIH Foundation to construct the NIH Edmond J. Safra Family Lodge which opened in 2005.

Gallin stressed the importance of collaboration and helped open the Clinical Center and its depth of resources to the research community outside NIH.

Memberships
Gallin is a member of the National Academy of Medicine (formerly the Institute of Medicine) of the National Academy of Sciences, the Association of American Physicians, the American Society for Clinical Investigation, and the American College of Physicians (Master). He is an elected member of the Royal College of Physicians-London.

Awards and honors
 2022 Weill Cornell Medical College Alumni Award of Distinction
 2021 Elected Member of the Royal College of Physicians-London 
 2016 Abby Rare Voice award
 2006 American College of Physicians Richard and Hinda Rosenthal Foundation Award
 2006 Department of Health & Human Services Secretary's Award for Distinguished Service
 2002 Society for Leukocyte Biology Marie T. Bonazinga Lifetime Achievement Award
 1996 NIH G. Burroughs Mider Lectureship
 1990 Jeffrey Modell Foundation Lifetime Achievement Award
 1988 Honorary Doctor of Science, Amherst College
 1987 Infectious Diseases Society of America Squibb Award
 1984 American Federation for Clinical Research Award for Clinical Research
 1969 Dean William Mecklenburg Polk Memorial Prize in Research, (Cornell Medical College)
 1969 Anthony Seth Werner Memorial Prize in Infectious Diseases (Cornell Medical College)

USPHS awards
 2001 Physician Executive of the Year
 1993 Surgeon General's Exemplary Service Medal
 1992 Distinguished Service Medal
 1991 Award for Orphan Product Development
 1988 Meritorious Service Medal
 1985 Outstanding Service Medal
 1980 Commendation Medal

Personal life
In 1966, Gallin married Elaine Klimerman Gallin, a scientist with whom he has collaborated. They have two children: Alice Jennifer Gallin-Dwyer, trained as a lawyer and now working as the deputy director at the Washington Monthly and raising three children, and Michael Louis Gallin, an architect practicing outside New York City who has two children.

Selected publications
Books
 Gallin, J. I., Ognibene, F.P., Johnson, L.L. "Principles and Practice of Clinical Research, 4th ed." New York, Academic Press 2018. 
 Gallin, J. I., Snyderman, R., Haynes B F., Nathan C., Fearon D.T. "Inflammation: Basic Principles and Clinical Correlates, 3rd Ed." New York, Lippincott, Williams and Wilkins. 1999. 
 Metcalf, J. A., Gallin, J. I., Nauseef, W. M. and Root, R. K. "Laboratory Manual of Neutrophil Function." New York, Raven Press, Ltd. 1986. 
 Gallin, J. I. and Quie, P. G. "Leukocyte Chemotaxis: Methods, Physiology and Clinical Implications." New York, Raven Press, Ltd. 1978. 

Journal articles

References

External links

1943 births
Living people
American immunologists
Members of the United States National Academy of Sciences
American medical researchers
National Medal of Science laureates
Recipients of the Public Health Service Distinguished Service Medal
Weill Cornell Medical College alumni
HIV/AIDS researchers
National Institutes of Health people
United States Public Health Service Commissioned Corps admirals
United States Public Health Service Commissioned Corps officers
United States Public Health Service personnel
Members of the National Academy of Medicine